The New Art Examiner was an international magazine of critical art thinking founded in Chicago, Illinois, in October 1973 by Derek Guthrie and Jane Addams Allen. Publication ceased in 2002. As of 2023 there are two publications using the name and styling of the New Art Examiner. It officially relaunched in 2015 (Chicago) but there was a dispute/split between editors Derek Guthrie and Michel Segard in 2017. The operation working out of the UK (.net) lost a recent trademark case (2021) to the operation in the U.S. (.org) and is currently illegally infringing on use of the name and the logo.

An anthology of representative articles and editors from New Art Examiner, Essential New Art Examiner, was published in 2011.

History
At the time of the New Art Examiners launch in October 1973, Chicago was "an art backwater" according to Artnet's Victor Cassidy. Artists who wished to be taken seriously left Chicago for New York City, and apart from a few local phenomena, such as the Hairy Who, little attention was given to Chicago art and artists. Time Out Chicago praised New Art Examiner for its Midwestern focus and its "refus[al] to portray that city [New York] as the only place in the U.S. where artists, galleries and museums do anything worthwhile".

Editor Jane Addams Allen, an art historian who studied under Harold Rosenberg at the University of Chicago and a relative of progressive reformer Jane Addams, was influential in developing new writers who later became significant on the New York scene and encouraged a writing style that was lively, personal, and honestly critical.

The critics and artists who wrote for the New Art Examiner included Devonna Pieszak, Fred Camper, Jan Estep, Ann Wiens, Bill Stamets, Michael A. Weinstein, Adam Green, Robert Storr, Carol Diehl, Jerry Saltz, Eleanor Heartney, Betty McCasland, Carol Squiers, Janet Koplos, Vince Carducci, Danielle Probst, and  Mark Staff Brandl.

The New Art Examiner ceased publishing in 2002 as a result of a funding shortfall.

In 2011 the NIU Art Museum held an exhibition exploring the significance and history of the magazine.

In November 2011, Northern Illinois University Press published The Essential New Art Examiner, containing 37 pieces from the original run of the magazine which serve as a record of contemporary art and its key figures and institutions (especially in Chicago) during that period. Reviewers from Newcity and Time Out Chicago praised the insight provided by some of the included articles while criticising the overall selection, with Time Out writing of the editors "cramming in bland writing by famous names at the expense of articles that could offer much-needed insight into Chicago".

An attempted relaunch beginning in 2015 was marred by disputes between editors and funders.

Criticisms
Over the decades following the founding of the New Art Examiner, Chicago's art scene flourished, with new museums, more art dealers, and increased art festivals, galleries, and alternative spaces. Art writer Victor M Cassidy claimed that the New Art Examiner "ignored, opposed or belittled" Chicago's artistic developments, that it was overly politicized, overloaded with jargon, and did not serve the Chicago or midwest arts communities.

See also
Visual arts of Chicago

References

External links 

www.newartexaminer.net
www.newartexaminer.org

Bimonthly magazines published in the United States
Magazines established in 1973
Magazines disestablished in 2002
Magazines established in 2016
Magazines published in Chicago
Visual arts magazines published in the United States